Forest of Piano, known in Japan as , is a Japanese manga series written and illustrated by Makoto Isshiki. It was serialized by Kodansha from 1998 to 2015, initially in Young Magazine Uppers before transferring to Weekly Morning. The serialization was irregular, and went on hiatus in 2002 before resuming in 2006. The series ended after 26 bound volumes. The series was adapted into a 2007 Japanese animated feature film by director Masayuki Kojima and production company Madhouse. The film featured performances by the renowned pianist Vladimir Ashkenazy. An anime television series adaptation produced by Gaina premiered from April 8, 2018, to April 14, 2019, on NHK.

Plot
Forest of Piano is a story that follows Kai Ichinose, a boy who lives in the red light district but escapes at night to play the piano in the forest. Shuhei Amamiya, the grade-school son of a professional pianist, transfers to Moriwaki Elementary, Kai's elementary school. But it doesn't take long before Shuhei is picked on by the class bullies, and gets involved in a dare to play the mysterious piano in the forest, leading to his meeting with Kai, who seems to be the only one capable of getting sound out of the thought-to-be broken piano. Kai's ability earns him the respect of Shuhei and his music teacher, former master pianist Sosuke Ajino. Both Shuhei and Ajino try to get Kai to take proper piano lessons, but Kai is at first resistant to refining his piano-playing technique. However, after hearing Sosuke play a Chopin piece he just can't seem to play himself, he relents.

Characters
 
 
 Kai is the son of a prostitute. He is an elementary school student who often plays the mysterious piano in the forest. He has the ability to instantly remember any piano piece he hears and play it back perfectly. In the future, he is a renowned pianist. 
 
 
 Sosuke is the music teacher at Kai and Shuhei's school. In his youth he was a famous pianist who won several awards for his playing, however his career was abruptly ended after an accident injured his left hand and killed his fiance. After discovering Kai's affinity for the piano, he becomes his coach.
 
 
 Shuhei is a transfer student from Tokyo who makes quick friends with Kai following their love for the piano.
 
 
 A Chinese pianist studying abroad in Poland. He is one of the participants in the International Chopin Piano Competition and is favored to win. His piano style sounds eerily similar to Ajino's before his accident.
 
 
 A Polish pianist and one of the participants in the International Chopin Piano Competition. He is often called the "New Star of Poland". 
 
 
 Takako appears as one of the participants at the regional piano competition. She was inspired by Kai to become a better pianist.
 
 

 
 

 
 
 Namie is Shuhei's mother.

Development
Makoto Isshiki was inspired to write Forest of Piano when she watched a documentary showing Stanislav Bunin winning the International Frédéric Chopin Piano Competition in 1985.

Media

Manga
Forest of Piano is written and illustrated by Makoto Isshiki. It was published by Kodansha in Japan, who first serialized the series in the seinen manga magazine Young Magazine Uppers from 1998 to 2004, and later in Weekly Morning from 2004 to 2015. The series was published into 26 tankōbon volumes, with the first volume being released on August 6, 1999, and the final volume released on December 22, 2015.

The series is licensed by Sharp Point Press in Taiwan. Kodansha Comics acquired the series for publication in English, and are releasing the volumes digitally.

Anime
An anime television series adaptation produced by Gaina aired from April 8, 2018, to April 14, 2019, on NHK. The first season is directed by Gaku Nakatani. Ryūtarō Suzuki as the series director, Aki Itami and Mika Abe are in charge of series composition, and Sumie Kinoshita is handling character designs. Harumi Fuuki is composing the series' music. The anime was originally listed to air for 12 episodes, but was later announced to air for 24 episodes. The 24 episodes will air in two seasons, with the first season airing from April to July 2018, and the second season airing from January to April 2019. Hiroyuki Yamaga will take over as director for the second season, while the most of the staff and cast will reprise their roles. Netflix have announced that they had acquired exclusive streaming rights for the series worldwide, and simulcast the series in Japan, and released the series globally in September 2018.

Season 1

Season 2

Reception
Forest of Piano received the Grand Prize for best manga at the 12th Japan Media Arts Festival in 2008.

The movie adaptation debuted in 9th place at the Japanese box office the week it came out, unusually high for a non-franchise animated film. By the end of the year, it had grossed the equivalent of $1,555,297, ranking 119 on the overall yearly box office chart for Japan. In South Korea, the film played for 50 weeks and grossed the equivalent of $182,884. The film was nominated for the 2008 Japan Academy Prize for Animation of the Year.

Notes

References

External links
 Piano no Mori at Weekly Morning 
 Official anime website 
  
 

2007 anime films
Animated films based on manga
Kodansha manga
Madhouse (company)
Netflix original anime
Music in anime and manga
NHK original programming
Seinen manga
Sharp Point Press titles
Works about pianos and pianists